Acer tschonoskii (in Japanese ミネカエデ, Mine-kaede, literally "ridge maple"), the butterfly maple or Tschonoski's maple, is a species of shrub or small tree native to Japan and the Kuril Islands. It is one of the least invasive,  easiest to grow, and hardiest species of maples, but remains rarely used in gardens. A. tschonoskii var. australe, (in Japanese ナンゴクミネカエデ, Nangoku-mine-kaede, literally "southern Tschonoski's maple"), a variety of A. tschonoskii, is distributed from Iwate Prefecture southward to Shikoku and Kyushu.

References

tschonoskii
Plants described in 1886